The Ivondro River in Alaotra-Mangoro and Atsinanana regions,  is located in central-eastern Madagascar. It drains to the eastern coast. It flows into the Canal des Pangalanes and the Indian Ocean south of Toamasina. 

A hydro-power station will be built near Volobe.

The National Road 2 crosses this river near Fanandrana, Toamasina.

References 

List of rivers of Madagascar

Rivers of Madagascar
Rivers of Alaotra-Mangoro
Rivers of Atsinanana